The Rolls-Royce Trent XWB is a high bypass turbofan produced by Rolls-Royce plc.

In July 2006, the Trent XWB was selected to power exclusively the Airbus A350.

The first engine was run on 14 June 2010,
it first flew on an A380 testbed on 18 February 2012,
it was certified in early 2013,
and it first flew on an A350 on 14 June 2013.

It had its first in-flight shutdown on 11 September 2018 as the fleet accumulated 2.2 million flight hours.

It keeps the characteristic three-shaft layout of the Rolls-Royce Trent, with a 3.00 m (118 in) fan, an IP and HP spool.
The  engine has a 9.6:1 Bypass ratio and a 50:1 Pressure ratio.
It is the most powerful among the Trent family.

Development

By 2004 Airbus had been facing pressure from customers to develop a competitor to the Boeing 787 Dreamliner, then in October 2005 launched the A350, at the time an improved A330. Rolls-Royce initially offered a conventional bleed air engine variant of the Trent 1000 with a throttle-push to  static thrust, the Trent 1700.

Before the December 2008 design freeze, Airbus established that the A350's empty weight was 2.2t greater than the 133.5t target. Due to this, the MTOW was increased by 3t in order to maintain the payload and range capability. As a further result, Rolls-Royce announced that the nominal engine thrusts were increased slightly, each variant receiving an additional  thrust. A350 programme chief Didier Evrard was quoted as saying that the change had a "very marginal" impact on fuel consumption.

Testing 

The first engine test on a static test-bed was made on 14 June 2010.
On 18 February 2012, Airbus announced that the Trent XWB had successfully made its maiden flight aboard Airbus’ dedicated Airbus A380 flying test bed.
By October, the first engine was expected to enter service in 2014.
Certification for the early engine variants was achieved in early 2013.
The first flight of the Trent XWB powering the Airbus A350 XWB took place on 14 June 2013.

On 15 May 2014 Rolls-Royce delivered the first production  thrust Trent XWB engines intended for the first Airbus A350 XWB to enter service with Qatar Airways.
Final assembly of these production engines had started in February 2014.
On 15 July 2014 Rolls-Royce announced the first run of the Trent XWB-97 powerplant with  thrust for the Airbus A350-1000.

Operations

On 26 July 2017, Airbus delivered the 100th A350, on track for 10 per month by 2018 end, and over the first 30 months most engine removals have been to stagger the on-wing life of a particular aircraft or to collect in-service data; nine in ten of the Trent XWBs have a long-term service agreements with Rolls, which has designated seven shops as MRO providers: its Derby facility, its joint ventures with HAECO, SIAEC,  and independents Delta TechOps, Mubadala and Air France Industries-KLM.
It passed 1 million flight hours in October 2017 without any in-flight disruptions and with a dispatch reliability of 99.4%.

By February 2018, it has completed 1.3 million flight hours with a 99.9% dispatch reliability.
It took two years to reach one million flying hours and nine months for the second million by July 2018, as 500 were delivered; at that time, it had a 99.9% dispatch reliability and had had no in-flight shutdown.
As the fleet accumulated 2.2 million flight hours and the leading engine has operated 3,500 cycles, an Iberia A350-900 delivered at the end of July diverted to Boston after an inflight shutdown at 41,000 ft on the September 11, 2018 flight from New York to Madrid, apparently due to slight secondary damage on variable stator vanes.

In 2019, the unit losses on the XWB-84 were reduced by over 20%, as Rolls-Royce expects break-even by the end of 2020, while fleet-leading engines had flown over 22,000h without a shop visit.
The higher-thrust XWB-97 for the A350-1000 remains a loss-maker, and could stay that way as extending time-on-wing is  more profitable.

Design 

The Trent XWB is an axial flow, high bypass turbofan keeping the characteristic coaxial three-shaft architecture of the Rolls-Royce Trent.
The 3.00 m (118 in) fan is driven by a 6-stage turbine, an 8-stage IP compressor is powered by a 2-stage turbine and a 6-stage HP compressor is turned by a single stage turbine, rotating in the opposite direction of the two others.
The annular combustor has 20-off fuel spray nozzles and the engine is controlled by a dual-channel FADEC.
The Trent XWB features a 2-stage IP turbine rather than a single stage from previous Trent engines.

The  engine version for the A350-1000 maintains the same 3.0 m fan size and a 5% larger core, the additional thrust will require the fan to run 6% faster which will require strengthening to withstand the increased fan-blade forces produced. It has thicker titanium fan blades and a stronger fan casing and takes advantage of technologies developed through the European Environmentally Friendly Engine (EFE) research programme. Its core operating temperature capability will be increased.

Orders 

On 18 June 2007, Rolls-Royce announced that it had signed a contract with Qatar Airways worth 5.6 billion at list prices, to power 80 Airbus A350 XWBs: US$ million each.

A large contract with Emirates to power 70 aircraft with Trent XWBs was announced on 11 November 2007, but never filled. The announced contract concerned 50 A350-900 and 20 A350-1000 aircraft, with a further 50 option rights. Due to be delivered from 2014, the Emirates order was potentially worth up to $8.4 billion at list prices, including options.
However, on 11 June 2014, Airbus announced that Emirates Airline had decided to cancel its order of 70 A350 XWB aircraft.

More than 1,500 engines had been sold by July 2015 to 40 customers. Rolls-Royce offered its maintenance programme to Vietnam Airlines for £340 million for 14 airplanes, or £ million per engine.

Variants

Specifications

See also

Notes

References

Airbus A350 XWB
High-bypass turbofan engines
Trent XWB
2010s turbofan engines